The progymnosperms are an extinct group of woody, spore-bearing plants that is presumed to have evolved from the trimerophytes, and eventually gave rise to the gymnosperms, ancestral to acrogymnosperms and angiosperms (flowering plants).  They have been treated formally at the rank of division Progymnospermophyta or class Progymnospermopsida (as opposite). The stratigraphically oldest known examples belong to the Middle Devonian order the Aneurophytales, with forms such as Protopteridium, in which the vegetative organs consisted of relatively loose clusters of axes. Tetraxylopteris is another example of a genus lacking leaves. In more advanced aneurophytaleans such as Aneurophyton these vegetative organs started to look rather more like fronds, and eventually during Late Devonian times the aneurophytaleans are presumed to have given rise to the pteridosperm order, the Lyginopteridales.  In Late Devonian times, another group of progymnosperms gave rise to the first really large trees known as Archaeopteris. The latest surviving group of progymnosperms is the Noeggerathiales, which persisted until the end of the Permian.

Other characteristics:
Vascular cambium with unlimited growth potential is present as well as xylem and phloem.
Ancestors of the earliest seed plants as well as the first true trees.

Strong monopodial growth is exhibited.

Some were heterosporous but others were homosporous.

Phylogeny
Progymnosperms are a paraphyletic grade of plants.

References

External links 
Progymnospermophyta
Botany: an introduction to plant biology

Middle Devonian first appearances
Middle Devonian plants
Mississippian plants
Mississippian extinctions
Late Devonian plants
Paraphyletic groups
Prehistoric plant taxa